The Ursa tension leg platform is an oil platform with a tension leg structure located at  about  southeast of New Orleans in the Gulf of Mexico. It is operated by Shell Oil Company.

Shell Oil is the operator of the project with 45.39%. BP Exploration & Production Inc has 22.69% while Exxon Mobil Corp and ConocoPhillips each have 15.96%.

The discovery well was drilled in 1991, with Sonat's Discoverer Seven Seas drillship, on Mississippi Canyon block 854. Construction was finished in 1998.

The Ursa Tension Leg Platform was replaced as the tallest man-made structure in the world by the Magnolia Tension-leg Platform.

See also
 List of tallest buildings and structures in the world
 Troll A platform

References

External links
 The World’s tallest structure isn’t a skyscraper
 UTLP at Offshore-technology.com

Energy infrastructure completed in 2009
Oil platforms
Petroleum industry in the Gulf of Mexico
Energy infrastructure in Louisiana
Shell plc buildings and structures
BP buildings and structures
ExxonMobil buildings and structures
ConocoPhillips